Krasnogvardeysky District is an administrative and municipal district (raion), one of the thirty-five in Orenburg Oblast, Russia. It is located in the northwest of the oblast. Its administrative center is the rural locality (a selo) of Pleshanovo. Population: 21,097 (2010 Census). The population of Pleshanovo accounts for 16.5% of the district's total population.

Demographics
Population: 21,097 (2010 Census); 

The ethnic composition of the population is as follows:
Russians: 54.0%
Bashkirs: 25.7%
Tatars: 6.8%
Germans: 4.3%
Ukrainians: 4.1%

Notable people
Gabdulla Amantay was a Bashkir poet, writer and playwright. The village where he was born, is in that area today.

References

Notes

Sources

Districts of Orenburg Oblast